Paul Andre Assenmacher (born December 10, 1960) is a former left-handed relief pitcher in Major League Baseball who played for fourteen seasons. Assenmacher pitched for the Atlanta Braves (1986–1989), Chicago Cubs (1989–1993), New York Yankees (1993), Chicago White Sox (1994) and the Cleveland Indians (1995–1999).

Assenmacher attended Aquinas High School where he was teammates with Jeff Kaiser. He played college baseball at Aquinas College in Grand Rapids, Michigan. He signed as an amateur free agent with the Atlanta Braves in 1983, making his major league debut with them on April 12, 1986.

In his career, Assenmacher compiled a record of 61–44 with a 3.51 ERA, saving 56 games and making one career start in 884 games. He is tied with Mike Jackson for most games pitched in the 1990s (644).

Although only a .083 hitter (3-for-36), Assenmacher was a very good fielding pitcher. He recorded a .986 fielding percentage with only two errors in 146 total chances in 855.2 innings pitched.

Assenmacher has spent nine seasons as the pitching coach for the baseball team at St. Pius X Catholic High School in Atlanta.

See also
 List of Major League Baseball single-inning strikeout leaders

References

External links 

Aquinas College Athletics Hall of Fame

1960 births
Living people
Major League Baseball pitchers
Aquinas Saints baseball players
Atlanta Braves players
Chicago Cubs players
New York Yankees players
Chicago White Sox players
Cleveland Indians players
Baseball players from Detroit
Gulf Coast Braves players
Durham Bulls players
Greenville Braves players
Richmond Braves players